The Orahovo Monastery is a Serbian Orthodox monastery in village Orahovo on Skadar Lake, near Virpazar in the Bar, Montenegro municipality, Montenegro. 

The monastic complex is one of the oldest monasteries in Montenegro. It has two churches and one residence. The older church is known as Boljan's church is dedicated to John the Baptist. The newer church is dedicated to Saint Nicholas. Church of Saint Nicholas was built in 1663. The monastic slava is on every 22 May, celebrating the translation of the holy relics of Saint Nicholas.

According to the traditional legends this monastery was built by Stefan Nemanja.

References 

Serbian Orthodox monasteries in Montenegro
13th-century Serbian Orthodox church buildings
Nemanjić dynasty endowments
Medieval Serbian Orthodox monasteries
Bar, Montenegro
Christian monasteries established in the 13th century
Church ruins in Montenegro
Medieval Montenegro